The Mahindra Quanto was a 7-seater mini SUV designed and manufactured by the Indian automaker Mahindra & Mahindra. Since 2016, the facelifted version of the Quanto was marketed as the Mahindra NuvoSport.

Specification

The Quanto is powered by a 1.5-litre mHawk three-cylinder 12-valve turbo diesel engine known as MCR100, and produces  at 3,750 rpm and develops  of torque at 1,600–2,800 rpm. It accelerates from 0 to 100 kmh (62 mph) in 16–17 seconds.

The Quanto is offered in four trim levels: C2, C4, C6 and C8. All models share the same diesel engine. Since the release, 1,782 units were sold in September. In October, sales were exceeded to 2,497 units. At the end of November, 2,297 units were sold.

Variants

NuvoSport (2016–2020) 

The Mahindra NuvoSport is the continuation and facelifted version of the Quanto, it was launched on April 4, 2016. The NuvoSport features a much different exterior design than the Quanto, but however, the interior design remains unchanged, apart from the added interior features. It is still powered by the same 1.5-litre mHawk turbo diesel engine as the previous Quanto.

In 2020, the NuvoSport was discontinued due to slow sales and BS6 Norms.

References

External links

Quanto
Cars introduced in 2012
Mini sport utility vehicles
All-wheel-drive vehicles